36th Brigade or 36th Infantry Brigade may refer to:

 36 Canadian Brigade Group of the Canadian Army
 36th Indian Brigade of the British Indian Army in the First World War
 36th Indian Infantry Brigade of the British Indian Army in the Second World War
 36th Engineer Brigade (United States) of the United States Army
 Task Force Mustang, formally known as the 36th Combat Aviation Brigade, of the United States Army
 36th Separate Guards Motor Rifle Brigade of the Russian Army
 36th Separate Marine Brigade of the Ukrainian Naval Infantry
United Kingdom
 36th Infantry Brigade (United Kingdom)
 Artillery Brigades
 36th Brigade Royal Field Artillery

See also
 36th Division (disambiguation)
 36th Regiment (disambiguation)
 36 Squadron (disambiguation)